is a Japanese women's football team which played Japan Women's Football League from 2012 to 2016.

See also
List of women's football clubs in Japan

References

External links
Official site

Women's football clubs in Japan